Buchireddypalem is a town in the Nellore district of India. It is the Buchireddypalem NagaraPanchayat part of the Kovur (Assembly constituency)  Located 15 km from Nellore city, it is located on the state highway connecting Nellore and Mumbai.... The nearest railway station is Nellore railway station, the nearest seaport is Krishnapatnam and the nearest airports are Tirupati and Chennai and in near future there will be a Nellore Airport .

Geography
It has an average elevation of 28 meters (95 feet).

Etymology
In the year 1715 a family man by name Dodla Anna Reddy migrated from the south (present-day Tamil Nadu) to a village called Vavveru since this place was having good water source and fertile land. Later his family established a settlement called Buchireddipalem in the name of their ancestors very close to Vavveru village. Till 1961 census it was known as a hamlet of Vavveru.

Places of Importance

 The Sri Kodanda Rama Swamy temple was built by the Dodla family in 1784 A.D., is also a notable feature of Buchireddipalem. Annual Bramhotsavams held starting from Ram Navami day are a major festivities for this town. Sita Ramula kalyanam on the Chaturdasi day is a major draw among the women devotees who attend in large numbers. Rathotsavam held on the Pournami day attracts huge crowds pulling the Temple Car (Ratham) amidst chants of 'Jai Sriram'in its designated route back to its starting point. Float Festival (Teppotsavam) held on the same day evening is a treat to the eye.
 Kanigiri reservoir one of the biggest man-made reservoirs in the state is located adjacent to the town which is a main source of living for the people around the town.
 The big D.L.N.R High School is located in Buchireddipalem, M. Venkaiah Naidu the Vice president of India studied in this school, similarly present MP of Nellore Mekapati Rajamohan Reddy is also an old student of this school

Festivals

Sri Kodanda Ramaswamy Brahmothsavam: It is celebrated for eleven days from Chaitra Suddha Navami to Bahula Chaviti (March–April) at Buchireddipalem town in Nellore district. On the Navami day in the morning ‘Dwajarohanam’ is performed and in the evening, the Lord with his consorts is taken on Adi Sesha Vahanam on the main streets of the old town.
On Dasami day Lord is made to ride on the Hamsa vahanam with beautiful flower decoration. On Ekadasi day the lord is atop Vyali vahanam in his majestic best. On the Dwadasi day, Lord is carried on his shoulders by his most ardent devotee Hanuman and is a very popular vahanam among certain communities of the town. On the Triyodasi day in the morning, Lord goes around the town in his famous Mohini avatar and in the night Lord is atop Golden Garuda with huge following of the public is taken out of the temple in a takeoff mode. This vahanam is made to go around the entire town and returns to the temple almost at the day break. Seetharamula Kalyanam is celebrated with the full religious fervour with huge attendance from people from all over on the Chaturdasi day and this event is generally more popular among the women folk who throng to get the ‘Talambralu’ (Rice mixed in turmeric and used during the celestial wedding). Seetha Lakshmana sametha Rama is taken to the southern end of the city to shower their blessings on the town folks. Once they return Lord Rama goes on the Gaja vahanam On the pournami day the three deities are put on the elaborately decorated ‘Ratham’ (Temple car) and this ratham is pulled by the thousands of devotees who visit the town from far and near for this event. Normally it takes about 45 minutes for the Ratham to complete its journey and reaches the resting place. During the evening hours, the Lord is taken for a boat ride on a specially built float ‘Theppa’ which is well decorated with lights in the temple tank for three rounds. On completion of the Theppotsavam, Lord goes around the town in Krishna avatar on ‘Ponnamanu seva’. On the Padyami day, Lord goes on his Ashwa vahanam and there is a story of ‘Paruveta’ on triyodasi day chakrasnanam is performed and Dwaja avarohanam is conducted.

References

 
 A Manual of the Nellore District in the Presidency of Madras 1873
 Aluru family is a king of Buchi reddy palem

Towns in Nellore district